Spiel- und Sportverein Jeddeloh II e.V., commonly known as SSV Jeddeloh or SSV Jeddeloh II, is a German association football club based in the community of Jeddeloh II in the municipality of Edewecht, located in the district of Ammerland, Lower Saxony.

History

In 2017, SSV Jeddeloh prematurely secured the Oberliga Niedersachsen championship and thus managed promotion to the Regionalliga Nord, where in the 2017–18 season the team finished seventh. The highlight of the season was the derby against VfB Oldenburg in front of 2,000 spectators, which Jeddeloh won 2–0.

Stadium
The club plays its home matches at the 53acht-Arena, previously known as the Sportplatz Wischenstraße, which has a capacity of 1,500. The stadium has no grandstand.

Recent seasons
The recent season-by-season performance of the club:

Honours
 Oberliga Niedersachsen
 Champions: 2016–17
 Landesliga Weser-Ems
 Champions: 2011–12
 Bezirksliga Weser/Ems 2
 Champions: 2006–07, 2008–09

Players

Current squad

References

External links
  

Football clubs in Germany
Football clubs in Lower Saxony
Association football clubs established in 1951
1951 establishments in Germany